The Austar coal mine is a coal mine located near Paxton, New South Wales. The mine has coal reserves amounting to 221 million tonnes of coking coal, one of the largest coal reserves in Asia and the world. In 2012, the mine had an annual production capacity of 3 million tonnes of coal and employed 409 people.

This colliery incorporates the former Pelton, Cessnock No.1 (Kalingo) and Ellalong collieries near Paxton, all of which had closed during the coal slumps, and was opened (or re-opened) in July 1979. The adjoining old Bellbird South colliery was later added, and the entire complex was renamed Southland colliery. In October 2004 there was an underground fire and the mine was sealed. The company, Gympie Gold, was forced into receivership and the mine was placed in a 'care and maintenance' position. In December 2004 the Chinese company Yancoal purchased the colliery, changed its name to Austar Coal Mine, and recommenced operations. It moved to care and maintenance in March 2020.

References

Coal mines in New South Wales
Hunter Region